The zinc 1 Reichspfennig coin was minted by Nazi Germany between 1940 and 1945 during World War II, replacing the bronze version. It is worth 1/100 or .01 of a Reichsmark. Made entirely of zinc, the 1 Reichspfennig is an emergency issue type, similar to the zinc 5 and 10 Reichspfennigs, and the aluminum 50 Reichspfennig coins from the same period.

Mint marks

Mintage

1940

1941

1942

1943

1944

1945

References

Zinc and aluminum coins minted in Germany and occupied territories during World War II
One-cent coins